Gindanes is a genus of skippers in the family Hesperiidae.

Species
Recognised species in the genus Gindanes include:
 Gindanes brebisson Latreille, [1824]
 Gindanes brontinus Godman & Salvin, [1895]
 Gindanes kelso (Evans, 1953)

References

Natural History Museum Lepidoptera genus database

Pyrginae
Hesperiidae genera
Taxa named by Frederick DuCane Godman
Taxa named by Osbert Salvin